Makahesi Makatoa (born 30 January 1993) is a Cook Islands international rugby league footballer who plays as a  or  forward for the Parramatta Eels in the NRL.

He previously played for Featherstone Rovers in the RFL Championship.

Background
Makatoa was born in New Plymouth, New Zealand, of Niuean and Cook Islander descent. He played junior rugby league for the Marist Dragons in his hometown.

Playing career

Early career
Makatoa played 5 matches for the Canterbury-Bankstown Bulldogs in the NRL Under-20s in 2013.

Makatoa played for the Mount Pritchard Mounties in the New South Wales Cup in 2017 and 2018.

Featherstone Rovers
Makatoa signed with the Featherstone Rovers in the RFL Championship in 2019, following head coach Ryan Carr from Mounties to the Rovers.

Parramatta Eels
Makatoa joined the Parramatta Eels' New South Wales Cup squad in 2020, again under coach Carr.
In Round 22 2021, Makatoa made his NRL debut for Parramatta against the Manly-Warringah Sea Eagles at Sunshine Coast Stadium, which ended in a 56-10 defeat.
In December 2021, he signed a new deal to remain at Parramatta until the end of the 2023 season. Makatoa played 23 games for Parramatta in the 2022 NRL season including two finals matches. Makatoa was left out of Parramatta's preliminary final team which defeated North Queensland to reach the 2022 NRL Grand Final. Makatoa was not included in Parramatta's grand final team which lost 28-12 against Penrith.

References

External links

Canberra Raiders profile
Raiders profile

1993 births
Living people
Cook Islands national rugby league team players
Featherstone Rovers players
Mount Pritchard Mounties players
New Zealand rugby league players
New Zealand people of Niuean descent
New Zealand sportspeople of Cook Island descent
Parramatta Eels players
Rugby league locks
Rugby league players from New Plymouth
Rugby league props
Rugby league second-rows